Kroppedal is a cultural-historical and astronomical museum in Vridsløsemagle  from Copenhagen, Denmark.  Kroppedal is the national museum of Danish astronomy, has a large archaeological unit, and an ethnological unit specializing in modern society.

History
Kroppedal was established in 2002 by an amalgamation of the Ole Rømer Museum and the Antiquarian Unit in Copenhagen County. 
The museum has a permanent exhibition centred on noted astronomer and engineer Ole Rømer (1644–1710).
Kroppedal is located near the site of  Ole Rømer's Tusculanum Observatory.
Its collections include his only surviving pendulum clock.

References

External links 
 Kroppedal Museum website

Museums in the Capital Region of Denmark
Museums established in 2003
Science museums in Copenhagen
Astronomy museums